Kelly Harrell (September 13, 1889 – July 9, 1942) was an American country music singer in the 1920s. He recorded more than a dozen songs for OKeh and Victor Records and wrote songs which were recorded by other artists, including Jimmie Rodgers and Ernest Stoneman, in his own lifetime.

Biography
Harrell was born in Draper's Valley, Wythe County, Virginia and from his early teens worked in various textile mills. In early 1925, when Harrell was already 35 years old, he went to New York City and recorded four tracks for Victor Records, among them "New River Train" (also recorded that year by Henry Whitter, a decade later by Charlie and Bill Monroe) and "The Roving Gambler". He recorded for OKeh later that year, including a version of "The Wreck of the Old 97" and "I Was Born 10,000 Year Ago" (the latter often known as "The Bragging Song" and recorded by Elvis Presley, The New Christy Minstrels, Odetta and several others).

He made more records for Victor in 1925, 1926, 1927 and 1929. "The Butcher's Boy" and "I Wish I Was A Single Girl Again" on Victor 19563 on 1/7/25. "The Dying Hobo" (1926) is a variant of the traditional English folk song "George Collins". "My Name Is John Johannah" was recorded in 1927 at RCA Victor's studios in Camden, NJ, with Posey Rorer on fiddle, Alfred Steagal on guitar and R.D. Hundley on banjo. Bob Dylan used the tune of "John Johannah" as the basis of his song "Long Time Gone". In a prose piece, "For Dave Glover" (Newport Folk Festival programme 1963), Dylan writes: "I can't sing "John Johannah" cause it's his story and his people's story."

After 1929, his recording career came to a halt, owing to his inability to play an instrument — Harrell always required backing by other musicians, and the Great Depression had so damaged the recording business that Victor was unwilling to pay the cost of hiring backup musicians.

Harrell's "My Name Is John Johannah" and “Charles Giteau” appeared on Harry Smith's Anthology of American Folk Music (1952), which was extremely influential on the folk revival of the 1950s-60s. Harrell's complete recorded music was reissued by Bear Family on a triple-LP set in the 1970s, and he is also represented by an LP on the County label. More recently, Worried Blues was released 2006

References

External links
 

1889 births
1942 deaths
People from Wythe County, Virginia
American country singer-songwriters
Old-time musicians
Country musicians from Virginia
20th-century American singers
Singer-songwriters from Virginia